is a private junior college in Atsugi, Kanagawa Prefecture,  Japan. It was established in 1974 by Sony Corporation next to its Atsugi Technical Center.

Initially, the school offered course work in electronic engineering and in housekeeping. Courses in Kindergarten education were added in 1979, and in business administration in 1986.

External links
 Official website 

Japanese junior colleges
Educational institutions established in 1974
Private universities and colleges in Japan
Universities and colleges in Kanagawa Prefecture
Western Metropolitan Area University Association